Matthew Jensen is an American cinematographer.

Jensen was born in Indiana and grew up in Northern Virginia. As a child, he took numerous classes at the Smithsonian Institution. He is a graduate of University of Southern California. His past credits include Game of Thrones, Fantastic Four, and Wonder Woman. In 2013, he became a member of the American Society of Cinematographers. Variety listed him as one of the "10 Cinematographers to Watch in 2017".

In 2021, Jensen won a Primetime Emmy Award in the Outstanding Cinematography for a Single-Camera Series category for the episode "Chapter 15: The Believer" from the series The Mandalorian.

Filmography 
Feature films

Short films

Television

Video game 
 Phantasmagoria: A Puzzle of Flesh (1996)

References

External links 
 Official website
 

Year of birth missing (living people)
Living people
American cinematographers
Artists from Indiana
Primetime Emmy Award winners
University of Southern California alumni